Tipseis (Greek: Τύψεις; English: Remorse) is the 31st studio album by Greek singer, Giannis Parios. It was released on 17 December 1997 in Greece by Minos EMI and reached double platinum status, selling 100,000 units. This is the first collaboration of Parios with songwriter, Phoebus.

Track listing

Singles
"Aponi Kardia"
"To Saraki"
"De Tin Noiazei"
"Diplo Krevati"
"Thlivero Topio"
"Odofragmata"

Credits
Credits adapted from album liner notes.

Personnel 

 Kostas Anagnostou: backing vocals (tracks: 2, 3, 5, 7, 8, 9, 10, 11)
 Hakan Bingolou: oud, säz (tracks: 3)
 Giannis Bithikotsis: bouzouki (tracks: 1, 2, 4, 5, 7, 8, 10, 11) || cura (tracks: 4, 5, 8, 11) || baglama (tracks: 1, 2, 4, 5, 7, 8, 10, 11) || mandolin (tracks: 12)
 Giorgos Chatzopoulos: guitars (tracks: 1, 2, 3, 4, 5, 6, 7, 8, 9, 10, 11)
 Stratos Diamantis: leslie organ (tracks: 3, 9)
 Pavlos Diamantopoulos: bass (tracks: 1, 2, 3, 4, 5, 6, 7, 8, 9, 10, 11)
 Erinta Dima: backing vocals (tracks: 2, 3, 5, 7, 8, 9, 10, 11)
 Thanos Gkiouletzis: violin (tracks: 5, 6, 7, 11, 12)
 Antonis Gounaris: guitars (tracks: 12)
 Katerina Kiriakou: backing vocals (tracks: 2, 3, 5, 7, 8, 9, 10, 11)
 Dimitris Kokotas: backing vocals (tracks: 2, 3, 5, 7, 8, 9, 10, 11)
 Giorgos Lebesis: backing vocals (tracks: 2, 3, 5, 7, 8, 9, 10, 11)
 Fedon Lionoudakis: accordion (tracks: 2, 4, 8, 10)
 Andreas Mouzakis: drums (tracks: 1, 2, 3, 4, 5, 6, 7, 8, 9, 10, 11)
 Alex Panayi: backing vocals (tracks: 2, 3, 5, 7, 8, 9, 10, 11)
 Giannis Parios: second vocal (tracks: 1, 4)
 Phoebus: orchestration, programming || backing vocals (tracks: 2, 3, 5, 7, 8, 9, 10, 11)
 Giorgos Roilos: harmonica (tracks: 12) || percussion (tracks: 2, 3, 4, 5, 6, 7, 8, 9, 10, 11, 12)
 Thanasis Vasilopoulos: clarinet, mizmar (tracks: 3)
 Nikos Zervas: string keyboards (tracks: 1, 3)
 Martha Zioga: backing vocals (tracks: 2, 3, 5, 7, 8, 9, 10, 11)

Production 

 Thodoris Chrisanthopoulos (Fabelsound): mastering
 Takis Diamantopoulos: cover photographer
 Manolis Kalogeropoulos: studio photographer
 Giorgos Stabolis: sound engineer
 Achilleas Theofilou: executive producer
 Manolis Vlachos: mix engineer, sound engineer
 Krina Vronti: artwork

Release history

References

Yiannis Parios albums
1997 albums
Minos EMI albums